Nar Jaffar Khan is a town and union council in Bannu District of Khyber-Pakhtunkhwa, Pakistan. It is located at 32°51'34N 70°44'4E and has an altitude of 290 metres (954 feet).

References

Union councils of Bannu District
Populated places in Bannu District